This is a partial list of Doris Day's recorded songs. Note that if no album name is given, the song was only issued as a single; if an album name is given, the song was only released as an album, unless it is stated that the song was released both as a single and on an album. All recordings were released by Columbia Records in the United States, except for those tracks included on The Love Album, and two songs which never were released in the US until incorporated in a compact disc album called "The 1960s Singles" in 2002: "Let the Little Girl Limbo" and "Oo-Wee Baby."    Doris Day's hits in the UK between 1955 and 1958 were released on Philips Records.

References

Day, Doris
 List